The Benito is a river in Equatorial Guinea. It is known locally as the Mbini River, and, at least as it flows in its westerly part through the Monte Alen National Park, as the Uoro River. The river rises in Gabon and crosses into Equatorial Guinea where it divides the country roughly along the middle, running east to west. Only this  portion of the river is navigable. The river is used to float logs for forestry operations. The cichlid genus Benitochromis takes the first part of its name from the Benito River.

References

Rivers of Equatorial Guinea
Rivers of Gabon
International rivers of Africa